Andrew Jackson is a Canadian actor known for his roles in television, film, anime, and video games.

Early life and education 
Jackson was born in Newmarket, Ontario. His mother was a high school music teacher and his father served in the Canadian Armed Forces.

Career 
Jackson has played major roles in various television shows and movies, including Merlin's Apprentice, All My Children, Family Passions, Wind at My Back (2nd season as David Doyle, the Dynamite Kid in "The Champ") (5th season as Vanaver Mainwaring, Grace Bailey's husband), Held Up, Criminal Minds, Deadly Betrayal, Kyle XY, Twists of Terror and Sea Wolf. He also provided the English dub voices of Lark in Devil Kings, Rubanoid, Plitheon, Sabator and Phosphos in Bakugan: Gundalian Invaders, Dylan, Wolfurio, Zenthon, Zenthon Titan, Slycerak, Spatterix and Balista in Bakugan: Mechtanium Surge, as well as the voice of Doji in Beyblade: Metal Fusion, as his predecessor Juan Chioran, voiced Doji in the first 32 episodes, and Rago in Beyblade Metal Fury.

Filmography

Film

Television

Video games

References

External links

Andrew Jackson's Official Website
Andrew Jackson Fansite

Living people
Canadian male television actors
Canadian male film actors
Canadian male video game actors
Canadian male voice actors
Year of birth missing (living people)